LP1 is the debut studio album by English singer-songwriter FKA Twigs, released on 6 August 2014 by Young Turks. Production for the album is handled by FKA Twigs herself, alongside Emile Haynie, Arca, Cy An, Devonté Hynes, Clams Casino, Paul Epworth, Sampha and Tic.

Upon release, LP1 received widespread critical acclaim, and placed high on several year-end critics' lists. The album spawned three singles: "Two Weeks", "Pendulum" and "Video Girl". The album was nominated for the 2014 Mercury Prize and the award for Best Recording Package at the 2015 Grammy Awards.

Background
FKA Twigs (then known simply as Twigs) self-released her debut extended play, EP1, on Bandcamp on 4 December 2012. Music videos were filmed for each of the four tracks and released on her YouTube channel. On 6 August 2013, The Guardian profiled FKA Twigs for their "New Band of the Day" feature, describing her as "[t]he UK's best example to date of ethereal, twisted R&B."

FKA Twigs's second extended play, EP2, was released through the Young Turks record label on 17 September 2013. It was produced by FKA Twigs and Arca. In December 2013, she was nominated for the BBC Sound of 2014, and was chosen by Spotify for their Spotlight on 2014 list. FKA Twigs was featured on Billboards 14 Artists to Watch in 2014.

Composition and lyrics
On LP1, Twigs expands her avant-pop landscape, yielding "boundaries-pushing" pop music. It also dons a large electronic component. Indeed, Entertainment Weekly felt that without Twigs' voice, it would be a work of avant-garde electronics. It is seen for its "glitchy futuristic" take on R&B, casting the genre in "thrilling hyper-real hues". Stereogum saw Twigs' music as "fluid" experimental R&B, while Q saw it as an "uncanny" fusion of indie R&B with "nervy" trip hop.

Lyrically, LP1 deals with themes of sex, sexual relations and intimacy.

Singles 
The lead single from LP1, "Two Weeks", was released on 24 June 2014 as a digital download and on 29 July 2014 as a 12-inch single, the latter featuring the song "Pendulum" as a B-side. The music video was directed by Nabil Elderkin and premiered on 24 June 2014."Pendulum" was released digitally as the album's second single on 30 July 2014. The self-directed music video for the song premiered on 14 January 2015 and depicts FKA Twigs tied up with her own hair.

The album's third and final single, "Video Girl", was sent to contemporary hit radio in the United Kingdom on 13 October 2014. The accompanying music video was directed by Kahlil Joseph and premiered on 29 October 2014. The black-and-white video sees FKA Twigs dancing for a prisoner on death row, and features a cameo appearance from rapper Travis Scott.

Critical reception

LP1 received widespread acclaim from music critics. At Metacritic, which assigns a normalised rating out of 100 to reviews from mainstream publications, the album received an average score of 86, based on 38 reviews, indicating "universal acclaim". Miles Raymer of Entertainment Weekly stated, "A singular kind of diva who asserts herself subtly, twigs sings in a near whisper that often threatens to blend in with the instruments behind it. But she exerts enough of a magnetic pull to lure listeners into some challenging territory". Christopher Hooton of The Independent wrote that "while sultry, drug-addled R&B is an increasingly crowded genre, Twigs takes a hammer to the kind that The Weeknd made famous and plays in the rubble." Hooton continued, "FKA Twigs emerges the high priestess of R&B's latest corruption, and the world will kneel at the altar." Kyle Fowle of The A.V. Club commended FKA Twigs for "manag[ing] to craft a cohesive aesthetic that draws on modern R&B and electronic while also remaining inventive", concluding, "Few debuts possess such control and ambition all in one; LP1 is the rare album that manages to sound both lived in and completely futuristic." AllMusic's Heather Phares noted the album contains "a lusher sound that's more accessible, and more overtly R&B, than FKA Twigs' earlier work but maintains its ethereal sensuality", adding that "FKA Twigs' music was already so fully realized that LP 1 can't really be called Barnett coming into her own; rather, her music has been tended to since the 'Water Me' days, and now it's flourishing."

Jonathan Zwickel of Spin described the album as "unconventional stuff, drug-like, elemental and extraterrestrial" and opined, "In its menacing incandescence, LP1 sounds like nothing else in the world right now." Pitchforks Philip Sherburne praised LP1 as a "huge album" and a "monumental debut", while writing that "FKA twigs is not a masterful lyricist, at least not yet; some of her couplets feel clunky, like she's grasping in the dark for rhymes and coming up with the objects closest to hand [...] But when she zeroes in on the essence of a thing, she hits hard." Alexis Petridis of The Guardian viewed the album as "a singular piece of work in an overcrowded market", and expressed that it "has its flaws [...] but you leave it convinced that FKA Twigs is an artist possessed of a genuinely strong and unique vision, one that doesn't need bolstering with an aura of mystique." Hazel Sheffield of NME commented that the album "impresses with its futuristic vision of R&B" and remarked that FKA Twigs's "pervading sense of control and commitment to her art proves that Twigs is set on building the sound of the future all by herself." Felicity Martin of Clash stated, "Fragile, heavenly and utterly compelling; this debut paves the way for boundaries-pushing pop. This is music that shatters you with a single tap." Q praised the music as an "uncanny" hybrid variously recalling "indie R&B... and nervy trip hop". Rolling Stones Julianne Escobedo Shepherd found the album to be "far more substantial" than FKA Twigs's two previously released EPs, adding that her "deconstructed shards of U.K. grime and garage land heavier, while elegiac vocals soften the songs without blunting their edge."

Accolades
On 19 August 2014, LP1 was included at number 87 on Pitchforks list of The 100 Best Albums of the Decade So Far. The album was shortlisted for the 2014 Mercury Prize. It was also nominated for Best Recording Package at the 57th Annual Grammy Awards. In late 2014, LP1 was voted the fifth best record of 2014 in the Pazz & Jop, an annual poll of American critics published by The Village Voice.

Commercial performance
LP1 debuted at number 16 on the UK Albums Chart, selling 4,051 copies in its first week. In the United States, the album debuted at number 30 on the Billboard 200 with first-week sales of 10,370 copies. As of August 2015, the album had sold 77,000 copies in the United States.

Track listing

Notes
  signifies an additional producer

Personnel
Credits adapted from the liner notes of LP1.

Musicians

 FKA Twigs – vocals ; instruments ; string arrangements, bass arrangement ; additional drums ; Tempest ; drums ; keyboards ; bass ; synths 
 Lucki Eck$ – demon voice 
 Arca – additional vocals ; additional programming ; synth ; instruments ; additional sounds, programming 
 Andrew Aged – guitar 
 Tic – guitar ; additional drums ; drums 
 Daniel Aged – upright bass ; additional keyboards 
 Emile Haynie – instruments, drums ; synths, Mellotron, additional drums 
 Devonté Hynes – guitar 
 Paul Epworth – drums, guitar, keyboards, piano 
 Cy An – keyboards, additional drum edits ; additional programming ; piano ; drums ; synths 
 LJ Howe – bass guitar 
 Sampha – drums, synths, piano

Technical

 FKA Twigs – production ; additional production 
 Joseph Hartwell Jones – vocal recording ; additional vocal recording ; engineering ; additional engineering 
 Arca – production ; additional production 
 Emile Haynie – production, recording 
 Devonté Hynes – production 
 Clams Casino – production 
 Paul Epworth – production 
 Sampha – production 
 Cy An – additional production 
 Tic – additional production 
 David Wrench – mixing
 John Davis – mastering at Metropolis Mastering (London)

Artwork
 Jesse Kanda – imagery
 FKA Twigs – design
 Phil Lee – design

Charts

Weekly charts

Year-end charts

Release history

Notes

References

2014 debut albums
Albums produced by Arca (musician)
Albums produced by Dev Hynes
Albums produced by Emile Haynie
Albums produced by Paul Epworth
FKA Twigs albums
Young Turks (record label) albums